"Salamander Street" is a song performed by Scottish singer-songwriter Callum Beattie. The song was released as a digital download on 26 June 2020 as the seventh single from his debut studio album People Like Us. The song peaked at number six on the Scottish Singles Charts.

Background
In early 2020 Beattie was interviewed by Robin Galloway on Pure Radio about his new album and chose for them to play 'Some Heroes Don't Wear Capes' in a tribute to NHS workers.  The station started playing three of his songs including Salamander Street.

Later that year, in an interview with Boogie and Arlene on Hits Radio, he thanked the radio station for their support of the song, he said, "I wake up every day to 200 messages and it's thanks to you guys, I know you think I have to say that, but genuinely I really appreciate your support." When he was asked about the reasons for writing a song about an area that's known for a certain type of nightlife, Beattie said, "It's a song about growing up in Edinburgh, and you know, I went to school with someone who I later saw in Salamander Street, and I just thought, it's a story that's real, and I wanted to write about it." He also said that he wrote the song in a cupboard in his mum's kitchen when he was just 18-years-old.

Music video
A music video to accompany the release of "Salamander Street" was first released onto YouTube on 26 June 2020. The video is about a former classmate who became a prostitute in Edinburgh. Talking about the video, Beattie said, "I LOVED shooting this video. 'Salamander Street' has always been a firm fan favourite, so it's great to have it out there. I also got to shoot the video during the night in a wet and empty Edinburgh during lockdown! What's not to like?"

Track listing

Personnel
Credits adapted from Tidal.
 David Jürgens – producer, composer, lyricist
 Al James Peden – composer, lyricist
 Callum Beattie – composer, lyricist, associated performer, background vocalist, guitar, vocals
 Joe LaPorta – mastering engineer, studio personnel

Charts

Release history

References

2020 songs
2020 singles